What's the time, Mr. Wolf? (also known as What time is it, Mr. Wolf?, 1 2 3 Piano in Belgium and in the United States What time is it, Mr. Fox?) is a form of tag played in Australia, Belgium, Canada, the United States, the English-speaking Caribbean, Ireland, New Zealand, South Africa, and the United Kingdom.

Because it needs attention skills, quick reactions, and working memory for the "it" child, it is recommended by Harvard University's Center on the Developing Child to assist in developing executive function skills for children aged 5 to 7.

Basic rules
One player is chosen to be Mr. Wolf. Mr. Wolf stands at the opposite end of the playing field from the other players, facing away from them. On some occasions, if the chosen player is female she is referred to as "Mrs.Wolf".  A call-and-response then takes place: all players except for Mr. Wolf chant in unison "What's the time, Mr. Wolf?", and Mr. Wolf will answer in one of the two ways:

Mr. Wolf may call a clock time (e.g., "5 o'clock"). The other players will then take that many steps, counting them aloud as they go ("One, two, three, four, five"). Then they ask the question again.
Mr. Wolf may call "Dinner time!"/"Lunch Time"/"Midnight", then Mr. Wolf will turn around and chase the other players. If Mr. Wolf tags a player, that player becomes the new Mr. Wolf.

Variants
In some parts of North America, the game is called "What's the Time, Mr. Shark?" when played at a pool or beach.

It is not uncommon for "Mr. Wolf" to be allowed to look around at the other players, before answering the question; especially if there is a rule involving penalties applied to "Mr. Wolf" if a player reaches "Mr. Wolf" before "Dinner time" is called.

There is also a simpler version of the game where "Mr. Wolf" faces the other players, who must remain stationary until "dinner time" is called. If any player moves on a time of day being called, that player becomes "Mr. Wolf".

In another version, Mr. Wolf holds a dandelion seed head and blows on it. The other players dance around them, taunting them by calling out "What's the time, Mr. Wolf?" After each blow, Mr. Wolf calls times in ascending order (e.g. "1 o'clock", "two o'clock", etc) until all the seed head has been blown away. "Mr. Wolf" then calls out "Dinner time!" and chases the other players, aiming to tag them before they can claim sanctuary at predesignated points called "Bar". The players claim "Bar" by yelling out "B - A - R  Bar" and touching the safety point. The skill is in deciding when the seed head is going to be completely blown away, as the players cannot run away until this happens. It could happen after one blow by "Mr. Wolf", or several. The first player tagged becomes Mr. Wolf for the next round of the game.

This game can also be played on a hopscotch court. The players chant "What's the time Mr. Wolf" and the wolf replies with a time. The players hop that number of spaces forwards on the hopscotch court. If "Mr. Wolf" answers with "It's dinner time" the players try to run back to the beginning of the hopscotch court before they are caught by "Mr. Wolf".

Similar games include Lupo Delle Ore in Italy, and Captain Midnight in the United States, in which everyone has to start running at midnight. The game also bears some resemblance to Red light, green light and Dahrumasan ga koronda.

Another variant of this game which has become popular is "Mr. Shark, Mr. Shark, what time is it?"  The big difference is that this game is played in a swimming pool, lake, or other swimming area.  When Lunch Time is called the player may try running through the water or swimming to get away from the shark.

A variant also exists in which the tagged players become wolves themselves, helping to tag the other players. The original wolf, however, still calls the numbers.

Popular culture

In music
The game was the basis for a 1991 song of the same name by New Zealand band Southside of Bombay, which appeared on the soundtrack of the film Once Were Warriors (1994). It peaked at number three on the New Zealand Singles Chart for four weeks following the movie's release, finishing the year as the eighth-best-selling single and earning a gold sales certification.
What's the Time Mr. Wolf? is the title of a 2007 album by British band Noisettes.
What Time Is It, Mr. Fox? (the common name for the game in US) is the name of a cabaret art rock band from Boston.
What's the Time Mr. Wolf? is a song by The Scaramanga Six, released on their 2017 album Chronica and the Wiggles, released on their 2019 album Party Time!

In print
The game has inspired children's books with this and similar titles. One was published in 2003 and illustrated by Annie Kubler, a second, published in 2007, was written and illustrated by Gemma Raynor. Harcourt published What Time Is It, Mr. Crocodile (2002), written by Judy Sierra and illustrated by Doug Cushman.

In film
The 1983 New Zealand film Utu, an historic drama depicting a Maori exacting revenge on English settlers in the 1870s, includes a scene where Maori leader Te Wheke beheads a vicar in a church, then places the bloodied head on the pulpit, saying the line "What's the time, Mr. Wolf?"
The 2019 Guy Ritchie film The Gentlemen includes a scene whilst Ray is in a tower block, some young street urchins are goading the gangster guarding the car, they spot his watch and one says "What's the time Mr. Wolf ?"

In television
The Australian children's show Bluey had moments where the children played this game in the episode "Shadowlands."

References 

Children's games
Tag variants
Outdoor games